Tahltan, Tāłtān, also called Tałtan ẕāke ("Tahltan people language"), dah dẕāhge ("our language") or didene keh ("this people’s way") is a poorly documented Northern Athabaskan language historically spoken by the Tahltan people (also "Nahanni") who live in northern British Columbia around Telegraph Creek, Dease Lake, and Iskut. Tahltan is a critically endangered language. Several linguists classify Tahltan as a dialect of the same language as Tagish and Kaska (Krauss and Golla 1981, Mithun 1999).

Language revitalization 
As of May 2013, language researcher Dr. Judy Thompson estimated that there are 30 Tahltan speakers. A new Language and Culture office is exploring evening "language immersion" classes, a Master-Apprentice program, and creating a "language nest" for teaching the language to young children. Scholarships are planned for part-time language learners.

Lacking written documentation, it was unclear to the language revitalization coordinator how to teach the language, and how to explain the grammar. "After a year of study, Oscar Dennis says he, along with Reginald and Ryan Dennis, have finally cracked the code on Tahltan language’s fundamental patterns." As a Dene language, like Navajo, Tahltan has “encoded” patterns in which small pieces are added to words to create meaning. "Dr. Gregory Anderson from the Living Tongues Institute visited our territory, and was so impressed with the team’s work that he said he 'couldn’t improve upon it.'"

A digital archive of Tahltan recordings, located "at the Tahltan Language Revitalization Offices in Dease Lake, Iskut and Telegraph Creek" can be used on iPods.

Phonology

Consonants
There are 47 consonant sounds:

Vowels

Phonological processes
 Vowel flattening.
 Consonant harmony
 Vowel nasalization
 Vowel laxing

References

 Cook, Eung-Do. (1972). Stress and Related Rules in Tahltan. International Journal of American Linguistics, 38, 231-233.
 Gafos, Adamantios. (1999). The Articulatory Basis of Locality in Phonology. New York: Garland Publishing, Inc. . (Revised version of the author's doctoral dissertation, Johns Hopkins University).
 Hardwick, Margaret F. (1984). Tahltan Phonology and Morphology. (Unpublished M.A. thesis, University of Toronto, Ontario).
 Krauss, Michael E. and Victor Golla. 1981. Northern Athapaskan Languages. In Handbook of North American Indians, Vol. 17: Languages. Ives Goddard, ed. pp. 67–85. Washington DC: Smithsonian Institution Press.
 Mithun, Marianne. (1999). The Languages of Native North America. Cambridge: Cambridge University Press.  (hbk); .
 Nater, Hank. (1989). Some Comments on the Phonology of Tahltan. International Journal of American Linguistics, 55, 25-42.
 Poser, William J. (2003). The Status of Documentation for British Columbia Native Languages. Yinka Dene Language Institute Technical Report (No. 2). Vanderhoof, British Columbia: Yinka Dene Language Institute.
 Shaw, Patricia. (1991). Consonant Harmony Systems: The Special Status of Coronal Harmony. In Paradis, C. & Prunet, J.-F. (Eds.), Phonetics and Phonology 2, the Special Status of Coronals: Internal and External Evidence (pp. 125–155). London: Academic Press.

External links 
 Tahltan Central Council language page
 OLAC resources in and about the Tahltan language
 Alderete, John, Tanya Bob and Thomas McIlwraith. An annotated bibliography of Tahltan language materials

+
Northern Athabaskan languages
Indigenous languages of the North American Subarctic
First Nations languages in Canada
Endangered Athabaskan languages
Native American language revitalization